Raphael Boumsong (born 12 March 1989) is a Cameroonian footballer who currently plays as a forward for Enyimba F.C. in the Nigeria Premier League.

References

External links
 

El-Kanemi Warriors F.C. players
Enyimba F.C. players
Living people
1989 births
Cameroonian footballers
Association football forwards